Quill Kukla (previously known as Rebecca Kukla) is a Canadian and American philosopher. They are a Professor of Philosophy at Georgetown University and the Senior Research Scholar at the Kennedy Institute of Ethics. They are also Humboldt Research Scholar at Leibniz University Hannover for 2020 and 2021. They are known for their work in bioethics, analytic epistemology, philosophy of language, and feminist philosophy.

Biography 

Kukla received their bachelor's degree in philosophy at the University of Toronto in 1990, and their PhD in philosophy at the University of Pittsburgh, where their supervisor was John Haugeland. Kukla held various academic appointments in the United States and Canada before taking up their current post at Georgetown; these include Johns Hopkins University, Queen's University at Kingston, Carleton University (where they held a tenured appointment), and the University of South Florida. At the latter, they were professor in both the Department of Philosophy and in the School of Medicine. Kukla is Editor-in-Chief of the Kennedy Institute of Ethics Journal and former Editor-in-Chief of Public Affairs Quarterly. They were formerly co-coordinator of the Feminist Approaches to Bioethics Network. They are currently finishing a master's degree in geography at CUNY.

Kukla has been interviewed about their work in various venues, including 3AM, Washington Post, Huffington Post, Slate, and Quartz. Their work on historical, cultural, and political attitudes towards bodies, especially those of mothers and pregnant women—found in their book, Mass Hysteria: Medicine, Culture, and Mothers' Bodies—has led to their being interviewed and authoring media articles on topics including the culture of pregnancy, sexual fetish, and attitudes towards race and obesity. They are a vocal defender of women, ethnic minorities, and other minorities, especially in academia, and have been interviewed in the media on this topic.

Kukla is a certified sommelier and a competitive boxer and powerlifter. They have won national and state-level medals in powerlifting.

Publications 

Books

Q. R Kukla, City Living: How Urban Spaces and Urban Dwellers Make One Another (New York: Oxford University Press 2021).

R. Kukla and M. Lance, 'Yo!' and 'Lo!': The Pragmatic Topography of the Space of Reasons (Cambridge: Harvard University Press 2009).

R. Kukla, Mass Hysteria: Medicine, Culture and Mothers' Bodies (Lanham, MD: Rowman and Littlefield 2005).

Edited books

J. Arras, R. Kukla, and E. Fenton, ed. The Routledge Companion to Bioethics (Routledge 2012).

R. Kukla, ed. Aesthetics and Cognition in Kant's Critical Philosophy (Cambridge University Press 2006).

Articles

Kukla has published widely in social epistemology, philosophy of language, philosophy of the applied sciences especially geography and medicine, and feminist and anti-oppressive philosophy. For a full list of their articles, see their institutional website.

Dissertation

Rebecca Kukla, Conformity, Creativity, and the Social Constitution of the Subject (Department of Philosophy, University of Pittsburgh: 1995).

References 

Year of birth missing (living people)
Living people
American feminists
American women philosophers
University of Pittsburgh alumni
City University of New York alumni
University of Toronto alumni
Georgetown University faculty
21st-century American women